Mbaïki (also spelt Mbaki or M'Baiki) is the capital of Lobaye, one of the 14 prefectures of the Central African Republic. It is situated in the southwest of the country, 107 km from the capital Bangui. The economy is based on the coffee and timber industries.  Lobaye people and Pygmy people live in the area.  There is also a waterfall near the town. Mbaïki was ceded by France to Germany under the terms of the 1911 Morocco-Congo Treaty, becoming part of the German colony of Neukamerun until it was reconquered by the French during World War I.  In 1995, the Roman Catholic Diocese of Mbaïki was established in the city.

As a consequence of the Central African Republic conflict (2012–present), its previously large Muslim population has been emptied from the town.

See also
 Prefectures of the Central African Republic

References

Sub-prefectures of the Central African Republic
Populated places in Lobaye